Anolis dunni, also known commonly as Dunn's anole and abaniquillo de Dunn in Mexican Spanish, is a species of lizard in the family Dactyloidae. The species is native to southern Mexico.

Etymology
The specific name, dunni, is in honor of American herpetologist Emmett Reid Dunn.

Geographic range
A. dunni is found in the Mexican states of Guerrero and Michoacán.

Habitat
The preferred natural habitat of A. dunni is dry forest in the Pacific coastal foothills, at altitudes below .

Description
The species A. dunni is moderate-sized for its genus. The dewlap of males is bright reddish orange, with small whitish dash-shaped markings.

Behavior
A. dunni is diurnal and arboreal.

Reproduction
A. dunni is oviparous.

References

Further reading
Duellman WE (1961). "The Amphibians and Reptiles of Michoacán, México". University of Kansas Publications, Museum of Natural History 15 (1): 1–148. (Anolis dunni, pp. 60–61).
Köhler G, Pérez RGT, Peterson CBP, Méndez de la Cruz FR (2014). "A revision of the Mexican Anolis (Reptilia, Squamata, Dactyloidae) from the Pacific versant west of the Isthmus de Tehuantepec in the states of Oaxaca, Guerrero, and Puebla, with the description of six new species". Zootaxa 3862 (1): 1–210. (Anolis dunni, p. 137).
Nicholson KE, Crother BI, Guyer C, Savage JM (2012). "It is time for a new classification of anoles (Squamata: Dactyloidae)" Zootaxa 3477: 1–108. (Norops dunni, new combination, p. 90).
Smith HM (1936). "A New Anolis from Mexico". Copeia 1936 (1): 9. (Anolis dunni, new species).

Anoles
Reptiles described in 1936
Taxa named by Hobart Muir Smith
Endemic reptiles of Mexico